Niphoparmena persimilis is a species of beetle in the family Cerambycidae. It was described by Stephan von Breuning in 1939.

It is 7 mm long and 2 mm wide, and its type locality is Rutshuru.

References

persimilis
Beetles described in 1939
Taxa named by Stephan von Breuning (entomologist)